The Apostolic Vicariate of Anatolia is a Roman Catholic Latin apostolic vicariate in the eastern half of Anatolia (Asian Turkey).

The missionary pre-diocesan jurisdiction is not part of any ecclesiastical province. It is under the direction of the Congregation for the Oriental Churches, an unusual structure for a Latin see, and directly dependent on the Holy See.

Its cathedral seat is the Marian Cathedral of the Annunciation in İskenderun (Alexandria). It has the Co-Cathedral of St. Anthony of Padua in Mersin as well.

History 
 Established originally on 13 March 1845 as the Apostolic Prefecture of Trabzon, named for its location on the Black Sea, not for any preceding jurisdiction.
 Suppressed on 12 September 1896, with its territory merged into the Metropolitan Archdiocese of Izmir in western Anatolia.
 Restored on 20 June 1931 as the Mission sui iuris of Trabzon, its territory taken from the Apostolic Vicariate of Constantinopole.
 Promoted on 30 November 1990 as the Apostolic Vicariate of Anatolia, led by a titular bishop.

As of 2020, the vicariate, which covers 450k square kilometers, had six parishes and two missions to serve a thousand Turkish Christians as well as Christian refugees from Syria, Iraq, Iran, Afghanistan, and Pakistan.

Ordinaries 
Apostolic Prefects of Trabzon (Independent Mission)
 Damiano da Viareggio, O.F.M. Cap. (1845 – 1852)
 Filippo Maria da Bologna, O.F.M. Cap. (1852 – 1881)
 Eugenio da Modica, O.F.M. Cap. (1881 – 12 September 1896)

Ecclesiastical Superiors of Trabzon
 Michele da Capodistria, O.F.M. Cap. (20 June 1931 – 9 March 1933)
 Giovanni Giannetti da Fivizzano, O.F.M. Cap. (9 March 1933 – 1955)
 Prospero Germini da Ospitaletto, O.F.M. Cap. (1955 – 1961)
 Michele Salardi da Novellara, O.F.M. Cap. (1961 – 1966)
 Giuseppe Germano Bernardini, O.F.M. Cap. (19 December 1966 – 30 November 1990)
 When Bernardini became archbishop of Izmir in 1983, he continued here as apostolic administrator.
Apostolic Vicars of Anatolia
 Bernardini continued as apostolic administrator when the vicariate was erected on 30 November 1990
 Ruggero Franceschini, O.F.M. Cap. (2 July 1993 – 11 October 2004)
 Luigi Padovese, O.F.M. Cap. (11 October 2004 – 3 June 2010)
 Franceschini returned as apostolic administrator (12 June 2010 – 14 August 2015)
 Paolo Bizzeti, S.J. (14 August 2015 – present)

See also 
 Catholic Church in Turkey
 Apostolic Vicariate of Istanbul (Constantinople)
 Roman Catholic Archdiocese of Izmir

References

Sources and external links 
 GCatholic.org with incumbent bio links
 Catholic Hierarchy

Roman Catholic dioceses in Turkey
Religious organizations established in 1845
Roman Catholic dioceses and prelatures established in the 19th century
Hatay Province
İskenderun
1845 establishments in the Ottoman Empire